Tshepo Tshite (born 5 January 1997) is a South African middle-distance runner specialising in the 800 metres. He represented his country at the 2019 World Championships reaching the semifinals.

International competitions

Personal bests
Outdoor
400 metres – 48.72 (Pretoria 2019)
800 metres – 1:44.69 (Pretoria 2019)
1500 metres – 3:41.62 (Heusden-Zolder 2019)

References

1997 births
Living people
South African male middle-distance runners
Athletes (track and field) at the 2019 African Games
African Games competitors for South Africa
World Athletics Championships athletes for South Africa
20th-century South African people
21st-century South African people